Fresu is a surname. Notable people with the surname include:

Ignazio Fresu (born 1957), Italian sculptor 
Paolo Fresu (born 1961), Italian jazz trumpet and flugelhorn player, composer, and music arranger

Surnames of Italian origin